Franklin Ward Tobey (February 7, 1844 in Jay, Essex County, New York – May 5, 1878) was an American lawyer and politician from New York.

Life
He was the son of Jesse Tobey (1800–1873) and Elizabeth (Farnsworth) Tobey (1814–1882). He studied law with Augustus C. Hand, was admitted to the bar in 1868, and practiced in Port Henry. He married Jenny Gertrude Ransom (1843–1925), and they had three children.

He was Supervisor of the Town of Moriah in 1869 and 1870; and was Chairman of the Board of Supervisors of Essex County in 1870.

He was a member of the New York State Assembly (Essex Co.) in 1872 and 1873.

He was a member of the New York State Senate (16th D.) from 1874 to 1877, sitting in the 97th, 98th, 99th and 100th New York State Legislatures. He was a delegate to the 1876 Republican National Convention.

During the fall of 1877, he became ill with "oedema of the heart." In December 1877, he went to Aiken, South Carolina trying to improve his health in the milder Southern climate, but did not get better, and decided to return home. He died on May 5, 1878, on board the steamer City of Savannah while en route from Charleston, South Carolina to New York City, and was buried at the Union Cemetery in Port Henry.

Sources
 Life Sketches of Government Officers and Members of the Legislature of the State of New York in 1875 by W. H. McElroy and Alexander McBride (pg. 104ff) [e-book]
 FRANKLIN W. TOBEY in NYT on May 8, 1878
 Tobey genealogy

External links
 Portrait of Franklin W. Tobey at Picture History [Gives wrong description of the person, but it's evident that the photo taken in 1875 in Albany shows State Senator Tobey.]
 

1844 births
1878 deaths
Republican Party New York (state) state senators
People from Jay, New York
People who died at sea
Republican Party members of the New York State Assembly
Town supervisors in New York (state)
19th-century American politicians